Beautify Junkyards are a Portuguese group influenced by English acid folk, Brazilian Tropicália and contemporary electronica.

Members
Led by João Branco Kyron on vocals and keyboards. With Martinez also on vocals, João Moreira on acoustic guitar and synth, Sergue Ra on bass and Antonio Watts on drums. Helena Espvall, formerly of Espers, joined the band on cello and acoustic guitar in 2017.

History
In 2012, the band’s first album was a collection of cover versions; mainly of classics of the British acid folk period, but also taking in Tropicália and German Kosmiche.  Their version of Kraftwerk’s Radioactivity was included on DJ Food’s Krafwerk Kover Kollection.  Their second album in 2015, The Beast Shouted Love, featured original songs with similar influences. In 2016 the band debuted on Ghost Box Records with a single as part of the label's Other Voices Series. Their first album for Ghost Box, The Invisible World of Beautify Junkyards was released in March, 2018.

Discography

References

Portuguese rock music groups
Musical groups established in 2012
Ghost Box Music artists 
Portuguese electronic music groups
Folk music groups
2012 establishments in Portugal
Fruits de Mer Records artists